Farnham Lake is a lake in the U.S. state of Minnesota.

Farnham Lake was named for Summer W. Farnham, a businessperson in the lumber industry and state legislator.

See also
List of lakes in Minnesota

References

Lakes of Cass County, Minnesota
Lakes of Wadena County, Minnesota
Lakes of Minnesota